The 2014 Macedonia listeriosis outbreak was an outbreak caused by Listeria food poisoning.

See also
 Listeriosis

References

2014 in the Republic of Macedonia
2014 disease outbreaks
Disease outbreaks in North Macedonia
Listeriosis outbreaks